Ibiza Airport  is the international airport serving the Balearic Islands of Ibiza and Formentera in Spain located  southwest of Ibiza Town. In 2020, the airport handled 2.1 million passengers (after more than 8.2 million in pre COVID-19 conditions in 2019), making it the thirteenth busiest airport in the country. As the island is a major European holiday destination, it features both year-round domestic services and several dozen seasonal routes to cities across Europe. It is also used as a seasonal base for Vueling.

History

1940–1989

The airport was first established as a temporary military airport during the Spanish Civil War, and it remained open after the conflict for use as an emergency airport. In 1949, the site was used to operate some domestic and international tourist flights, but it was closed in 1951.

It was not until 1958 that work commenced to re-open the airport in reaction to the rapid development of the tourist market in the Balearic Islands, particularly in neighboring Majorca. The airport reopened on 1 April 1958 with the first destinations during that year including Palma, Barcelona, Valencia and Madrid.

1990 to Today
The airport was expanded progressively over the subsequent decades with runway, taxiway, apron and terminal enhancements designed to cope with the growing air tourist market, which, by the late 1990s, was generating over 3.6 million passengers a year at the airport.

In 2011, the airport provisionally handled over 5.6 million passengers and around 61,000 aircraft movements, an increase of 11.9% and 8.4% respectively compared with 2010.

Airlines and destinations

Passenger

Cargo

Statistics

Accidents and incidents
 On 7 January 1972, Iberia Airlines Flight 602 struck a mountain when on approach to Ibiza Airport. All 104 passengers and crew on board were killed.

References

External links

Official website

Transport in Ibiza
Airports in the Balearic Islands